Dancing with the Tsars is a 2018 book by Irish journalist and author Paul Howard and is the eighteenth novel in the Ross O'Carroll-Kelly series.

The title refers to the TV series Dancing with the Stars and to the tsars, former rulers of Russia.

Release

Dancing with the Tsars was launched in Kiely's of Donnybrook, an iconic pub that featured in many Ross stories and was about to close down.

Plot

Sorcha is pregnant with a baby — possibly not Ross's. Meanwhile, Charles is at war with feminists, Sorcha is a Senator, Fionnuala is making trips to Russia, Ronan deals with sex addiction, while Ross and Honor aim to win the Mount Anville glitter ball.

Reception

It was shortlisted for the Specsavers Popular Fiction Book of the Year at the Irish Book Awards.

Dancing with the Tsars sold 15,032 copies in Ireland in 2018.

References

2018 Irish novels
Penguin Books books
Ross O'Carroll-Kelly
Fiction set in 2016
Fiction set in 2017